Maurice Douglas Lehmann (18 May 1931 – 5 December 2020) was an Australian rules footballer who played with Melbourne in the Victorian Football League (VFL).

Notes

External links 		

		

1931 births
2020 deaths
Australian rules footballers from Victoria (Australia)		
Melbourne Football Club players